Michał Fidziukiewicz (born 8 February 1991) is a Polish professional footballer who plays as a forward for Polonia Warsaw.

Club career
He is a MOSP Białystok home-grown. Fidziukiewicz also represented Jagiellonia Białystok, Ruch Wysokie Mazowieckie, Dąb Dąbrowa Białostocka, Gryf Wejherowo, Bocholter, Zagłębie Sosnowiec, GKS Tychy and Olimpia Elbląg. In June 2019, he became a player of Stal Stalowa Wola, signing a two-year contract. On January 14, 2021, his contract with Stal was terminated. On January 29, 2021, he signed a half-year deal with II liga club Garbarnia Kraków.

Career statistics

1 Includes 2008–09 Ekstraklasa Cup and 2020–21 Regional Polish Cup (group: Subcarpathian Football Association – Stalowa Wola) matches.

References

External links
 
 

1991 births
Living people
Sportspeople from Białystok
Polish footballers
Association football forwards
Ekstraklasa players
I liga players
II liga players
III liga players
Garbarnia Kraków players
Stal Stalowa Wola players
Jagiellonia Białystok players
Zagłębie Sosnowiec players
Gryf Wejherowo players
Olimpia Elbląg players
GKS Tychy players
Motor Lublin players
Polonia Warsaw players
Polish expatriate footballers
Expatriate footballers in Belgium
Polish expatriate sportspeople in Belgium